The Michael Schenker Group is the debut studio album by English hard rock band Michael Schenker Group, released in 1980. This was the first album after Schenker's departure from UFO in 1978 and brief reunion with Scorpions for the album Lovedrive.

Reception and legacy

The album was a commercial and critical success, entering the charts in the US, the UK and Japan, and was supported by the singles "Armed and Ready" and "Cry for the Nations". The album also topped the KTUH's charts on the week of 29 September 1980.

The song "Armed and Ready" is featured in the video game Guitar Hero: Metallica.

Track listing 
All songs written by Michael Schenker and Gary Barden unless otherwise noted.

Side one
 "Armed and Ready" - 4:05
 "Cry for the Nations" - 5:08
 "Victim of Illusion" - 4:41
 "Bijou Pleasurette" (Schenker) - 2:16 
 "Feels Like a Good Thing" - 3:44

Side two
"Into the Arena" (Schenker) - 4:10 
 "Looking Out from Nowhere" - 4:28 
 "Tales of Mystery" - 3:16 
 "Lost Horizons" - 7:04

2009 Reissue bonus tracks 
"Just a Lover" (demo) - 4:34
 "Looking Out from Nowhere" (demo) - 5:13
 "Get Up and Get Down" (demo) - 3:59
 "After Midnight" (demo) - 4:31
 "Breakout" (demo) - 4:42
 "Cry for the Nations" (radio edit) - 3:35
 "Armed and Ready" (live at the Manchester Apollo) - 4:40
 "Into the Arena" (live at the Hammersmith Odeon, London) - 4:13

Personnel 
Band members
 Michael Schenker – guitars
 Gary Barden – vocals

Session musicians
 Simon Phillips – drums
 Mo Foster – bass
 Don Airey – keyboards

Production
Roger Glover – producer
Gareth Edwards – engineer
Jeremy Allom – tape operator

1979 demos on 2009 reissue
 Michael Schenker – guitar
 Gary Barden – vocals
 Billy Sheehan – bass
 Denny Carmassi – drums

1980 Live tracks on 2009 reissue
 Michael Schenker – guitar
 Gary Barden – vocals
 Paul Raymond – keyboards
 Cozy Powell – drums
 Chris Glen – bass

Charts

References 

1980 debut albums
Michael Schenker Group albums
Albums produced by Roger Glover
Chrysalis Records albums
Albums with cover art by Hipgnosis